The Little Wheedlers (or Les petits câlins) is a French comedy film directed by Jean-Marie Poiré.

Plot
The story of three Parisian friends who live in the same dwelling. The first (Sylvie) is Salesmen clothing market, the second (Corinne) works in a university restaurant and the third (Sophie) is unemployed. The latter moves large displacement motorcycle.

Cast
Josiane Balasko as Corinne
Dominique Laffin as Sophie
Caroline Cartier as Sylvie
Roger Miremont as Antoine
Jacques Frantz as Marc
Patrick Cartié as Jean-Pierre
Claire Maurier as Sophie's mother
Jean Bouise as Sophie's father
Françoise Bertin as Antoine's mother
Jacques Maury as Margeron
Marc Eyraud as The bookseller
Marie Déa as The paper
Gérard Jugnot

Themes 
The film depicts the emancipation of women at the end of the 1970s. The radio advertisement during the theatrical release proclaimed: "Now it's the girls who flirt". As Thomas Morales notes, Les Petits Câlins captures “this shift where the strong woman takes power in relationships of seduction but above all where she questions the meaning of her life in a consumerist society”.

References

External links

1970s feminist films
1978 films
1978 comedy films
French feminist films
French comedy films
Films directed by Jean-Marie Poiré
1970s French films